Monomorium dentatum is an ant species which has been discovered on August 20, 2003, by M. R. Sharaf in Egypt and described by Sharaf, M. R. in 2007.

References

dentatum
Insects described in 2007